Abdelrahman Salah Orabi Abdelgawwad (born 9 October 1987) is an Egyptian boxer. A continental silver medalist at the 2015 African Games, he competed in the light heavyweight event at the 2016 Summer Olympics. He also competed in the men's light heavyweight event at the 2020 Summer Olympics.

References

External links
 

1987 births
Living people
Egyptian male boxers
Olympic boxers of Egypt
Boxers at the 2016 Summer Olympics
Boxers at the 2020 Summer Olympics
Place of birth missing (living people)
African Games gold medalists for Egypt
African Games silver medalists for Egypt
African Games medalists in boxing
Competitors at the 2015 African Games
Competitors at the 2019 African Games
Competitors at the 2013 Mediterranean Games
Competitors at the 2018 Mediterranean Games
Competitors at the 2022 Mediterranean Games
Mediterranean Games gold medalists for Egypt
Mediterranean Games medalists in boxing
Light-heavyweight boxers
21st-century Egyptian people